Through the history of Yugoslavia, the defence ministry which was responsible for defence of the country was known under several different names. The Ministry of the Army and Navy was responsible for defence of the Kingdom of Yugoslavia from 1918 to 1941, the Federal Secretariat of People's Defence for the Socialist Federal Republic of Yugoslavia from 1945 to 1992 and the Ministry of Defence for Serbia and Montenegro (officially named the Federal Republic of Yugoslavia between 1992 and 2003) from 1992 to 2006.

List of ministers

† denotes people who died in office.

Kingdom of Yugoslavia (1918–1941)

Minister of the Army

Minister of the Army and Navy

Yugoslav government-in-exile (1941–1945)

Minister of the Army and Navy

Minister of the Army

Minister of the Air Force and Navy

Minister of the Army, Navy and Air Force

National Committee for the Liberation of Yugoslavia (1943–1945)

SFR Yugoslavia (1945–1992)
The Federal Secretary of People's Defence of the Socialist Federal Republic of Yugoslavia (Serbo-Croatian, Croatian, Serbian, Cyrillic: Савезни секретар за народну одбрану СФРЈ) was that country's defence minister during its existence from 1945 to 1992. He was the head of the Federal Secretariat of People's Defence (Savezni sekretarijat za narodnu odbranu - SSNO) and it was the most effective military person, while the Chief of the General Staff of the Yugoslav People's Army (which was the formational part of SSNO) was the most professional and staff body.

It was the part of the Federal Executive Council (Federal Government).

Timeline

FR Yugoslavia / Serbia and Montenegro (1992–2006)
Following the breakup of Yugoslavia and the secession of four out of six constituent republic in the SFR Yugoslavia the remaining two (Serbia and Montenegro) established a federation in 1992 called the Federal Republic of Yugoslavia (FR Yugoslavia). This lasted until 2003 when it was reconstituted as a state union called Serbia and Montenegro. In 2006 both countries declared independence and parted ways.

Standards

See also
Ministry of Defence (Bosnia and Herzegovina)
Ministry of Defence (Croatia)
Ministry of Defence (Montenegro)
Ministry of Defence (Serbia)
Ministry of Defence (Slovenia)

Notes

External links
List of ministers at Rulers.org
Governments of the Kingdom of the Serbs, Croats & Slovenes (Yugoslavia) 1918-1945

Government of Yugoslavia
Yugoslavia
Military of the Kingdom of Yugoslavia
Military of SFR Yugoslavia
Military of Serbia and Montenegro
1918 establishments in Yugoslavia
2006 disestablishments in Serbia and Montenegro